Year 1151 (MCLI) was a common year starting on Monday (link will display the full calendar) of the Julian calendar.

Events 
 September 7 – Geoffrey of Anjou dies, and is succeeded by his son Henry, aged 18.
 After the Battle of Ghazni, the city is burned by the Prince of Ghur.
 The first plague and fire insurance policy is issued in Iceland.
 Bolton Abbey is founded in North Yorkshire, England.
 Anping Bridge is completed in China's Fujian province. Its total length will not be exceeded until 1846.
 Confronted with internal strife, the commune of Bologna is the first Italian republic to turn to the rule of a podestà, Guido di Ranieri da Sasso (it ends in 1155).

Births 
 April 3 – Igor Svyatoslavich, Russian prince (d. 1202)
 May 9 – al-Adid, last Fatimid caliph (d. 1171)
 Unkei, Japanese sculptor (d. 1223)

Deaths 
 January 13 – Abbot Suger, French statesman and historian (b. c. 1081)
 April 23 – Adeliza of Louvain, queen of Henry I of England (b. 1103)
 September 7 – Geoffrey V, Count of Anjou (b. 1113)
 Li Qingzhao, Chinese poet (b. 1084)

References